Oswald Blouin (born 28 January 1948) is a Canadian former sailor who competed in the 1968 Summer Olympics.

References

1948 births
Living people
Canadian male sailors (sport)
Olympic sailors of Canada
Sailors at the 1968 Summer Olympics – Star
Place of birth missing (living people)